Malbas is a professional basketball based in Malmö, Sweden. The club plays in the Basketettan, which is the second tier of basketball in the country.

Teams

Current roster

Men's

Women's

External links

Sport in Malmö
Basketball teams established in 1969
Basketball teams in Sweden